Tetragonoderus andrewesi is a species of beetle in the family Carabidae. It was described by Emden in 1934.

References

andrewesi
Beetles described in 1934